Boqsani (also Romanized as Boqşānī; also known as Bokhsānī, Beḩsānī, and Boqşānī-ye ‘Olyā) is a village in Nashtifan Rural District, in the Central District of Khaf County, Razavi Khorasan Province, Iran. At the 2006 census, its population was 354, in 71 families.

References 

Populated places in Khaf County